Big Man's West was a nightclub located at 129 Monmouth Street in Red Bank, New Jersey. It was owned by Clarence "Big Man" Clemons of Bruce Springsteen's E Street Band and managed by Terry Magovern and George McMorrow. Although the club was short-lived, together with The Fast Lane and The Stone Pony, it played a key role in the revival the Jersey Shore music scene during the early 1980s.

The club opened on July 11, 1981 with a concert given by the house band Clarence Clemons & The Red Bank Rockers. They were joined on stage by Springsteen and Gary U.S. Bonds for a set that included "Ramrod", "Around and Around", "Summertime Blues", "Jole Blon", "You Can't Sit Down" and "Cadillac Ranch". Throughout it short existence, Springsteen would go on to play at the Big Man's West regularly, making at least eighteen guest appearances. During 1982 he performed at the club with the likes of Junior Walker & The Allstars, Beaver Brown, John Eddie & The Front Street Runners, Southside Johnny, Sonny Kenn, Bill Chinnock, Iron City Houserockers  and Dave Edmunds. Other acts to perform at the club included Joan Jett, Steve Forbert, Jon Bon Jovi, Bonnie Raitt and Little Steven & The Disciples of Soul  The club would also feature popular Jersey Shore acts such as The Midnight Thunder Band fronted by Jobonanno,  The Jim Davison Band, The George Theiss Band and The Diamonds. Theiss was a former member of The Castiles, one of Bruce Springsteen’s earliest bands. The Diamonds, featuring former members of Cats On A Smooth Surface, made their debut opening for Little Steven at Big Man's West on December 16, 1982.

Through a combination of health and safety regulations and financial difficulties, Clemons decided to close the club in January 1983. On January 8, the final night the club was open, Clemons, Springsteen, Max Weinberg and Garry Tallent joined Larson for two songs, "Rockin' All Over the World" and "Lucille". In May 1984 Springsteen and the E Street Band, together with new recruit Nils Lofgren, also used the now defunct club for rehearsals for the forthcoming Born in the U.S.A. Tour.

References

Jersey Shore sound
Music venues in New Jersey
Music of Red Bank, New Jersey